Lincoln in the Bardo is a 2017 experimental novel by American writer George Saunders. It is Saunders's first full-length novel and was the New York Times hardcover fiction bestseller for the week of March 5, 2017.

The novel takes place during and after the death of Abraham Lincoln's son William "Willie" Wallace Lincoln and deals with the president's grief at his loss. The bulk of the novel, which takes place over the course of a single evening, is set in the bardo—an intermediate space between life and rebirth.

Lincoln in the Bardo received critical acclaim, and won the 2017 Booker Prize. Many publications later ranked it one of the best novels of its decade.

Conception and research

Background
The novel was inspired by a story Saunders's wife's cousin told him about how Lincoln visited his son Willie's crypt at Oak Hill Cemetery in Georgetown on several occasions to hold the body, a story that seems to be verified by contemporary newspaper accounts. In March 2017, Saunders provided more detail on the background and conception of his novel:

Saunders first announced the novel in a 2015 New York Times interview with the novelist Jennifer Egan, revealing that it would have a "supernatural element" while remaining "ostensibly historical". The novel's title was announced in a conversation between Saunders and Susan Sarandon in Interview magazine, in April 2016. That same month, a description of the book was posted on the Random House website.

Development
Saunders did not originally intend to write a novel (and had avoided doing so in the past), but the story of Lincoln cradling his son's body stayed with him, and he eventually decided to write about it. The novel began as a single section, and was fleshed out over time. 

To produce the book, Saunders conducted extensive research on Lincoln and the Civil War, consulting, among other books, Edmund Wilson's Patriotic Gore (1962). Saunders rearranged historical sources to get at the "necessary historical facts", and included excerpts from them in the novel. Many of these sources are cited in the book, along with some fictional ones. 

In a The New Yorker Radio Hour podcast with David Remnick, Saunders described how a melancholic Lincoln the Mystic statue, sculpted by James Earle Fraser, propelled him through the novel. The statue is in front of his office at Syracuse University, near the Tolley Hall.

Saunders has said that he was "scared to write this book". He worried about his ability to portray Lincoln, but decided that limiting his characterization to a single night made the writing process "not easy, but easier, because I knew just where he was in his trajectory as president". Given that his work is generally set in the present, Saunders compared writing a novel set in 1862 to "running with leg weights" because he "couldn't necessarily do the voices that I would naturally create".

Setting
Much of the novel takes place in the bardo, a Tibetan term for the Buddhist "intermediate state" between death and reincarnation when the consciousness is not connected to a body. In Saunders's conception, the "ghosts" that inhabit the bardo are "disfigured by desires they failed to act upon while alive" and are threatened by permanent entrapment in the liminal space. They are unaware that they have died, referring to the space as their "hospital-yard" and to their coffins as "sick-boxes".

Saunders has said that, while he named the setting after Tibetan tradition, he incorporated elements of the Christian and Egyptian afterlives, so as not to be "too literal." The selection of the term "bardo", he said, was "partly to help the reader not to bring too many preconceptions to it... in a book about the afterlife, it's good to destabilize all of the existing beliefs as much as you can."

Adaptations
Saunders has typically recorded his stories' audiobook adaptations himself, but given this novel's cast of 166 characters, he did not feel he could be the sole voice actor for its adaptation. His friend Nick Offerman agreed early in the production process to take a role, as did Offerman's wife, Megan Mullally. The two then recruited Julianne Moore, Don Cheadle, Rainn Wilson, and Susan Sarandon. Non-celebrities with parts include Saunders's wife, his children, and various friends. Other notable narrators include David Sedaris, Carrie Brownstein, Lena Dunham, Keegan-Michael Key, Miranda July, Ben Stiller, Bradley Whitford, Bill Hader, Mary Karr, Jeffrey Tambor, Kat Dennings, Jeff Tweedy, and Patrick Wilson.

Mullally and Offerman purchased the rights to produce a film version of the novel five weeks after it was released. Saunders will be involved in the process, and has said he hopes to "find a way to make the experience of getting [the] movie made as wild and enjoyable and unpredictable as the experience of writing it".

In February 2017, Lincoln in the Bardo was adapted as a 360-degree, interactive virtual reality video, commissioned by The New York Times. The adaptation was directed by Graham Sack and produced by Jennifer 8. Lee.

Reception

Critical reception
Lincoln in the Bardo was acclaimed by literary critics, with review aggregator Bookmarks reporting zero negative and only three mixed reviews among 42 total, indicating "rave" reviews. The novel won the 2017 Man Booker Prize. The novelist Colson Whitehead, writing in the New York Times, called the book "a luminous feat of generosity and humanism." Time magazine listed it as one of its top ten novels of 2017, and Paste ranked it the fifth best novel of the 2010s.

The novel has been compared with Edgar Lee Masters's poetry collection Spoon River Anthology, published in 1915. Tim Martin, writing for Literary Review, also compared its "babble of American voices," some from primary sources and some expertly fabricated, with the last act of Thornton Wilder's play Our Town.

Sales
The novel was listed as a bestseller in the United States by The New York Times and USA Today.

Translations
The novel has been translated into Polish by Michał Kłobukowski and published by Znak in 2018. In Brazil, it was translated into Portuguese by Jorio Dauster and published by Companhia das Letras in 2018. In Iran, it was translated in Persian by Naeime Khalesi and published by Jomhooripub in 2018. It was translated in Greek by Giorgos-Ikaros Babasakis and published by Ikaros in 2017. A Swedish translation (by Niclas Nilsson) was published by Albert Bonniers Förlag in 2018.

References

2017 American novels
2017 debut novels
Random House books
Novels about death
Booker Prize-winning works
Books about Abraham Lincoln
Novels about the afterlife
Experimental literature
Postmodern novels